Gabor wavelets are wavelets invented by Dennis Gabor using complex functions constructed to serve as a basis for Fourier transforms in information theory applications. They are very similar to Morlet wavelets. They are also closely related to  Gabor filters. The important property of the wavelet is that it minimizes the product of its standard deviations in the time and frequency domain. Put another way, the uncertainty in information carried by this wavelet is minimized. However they have the downside of being non-orthogonal, so efficient decomposition into the basis is difficult. Since their inception, various applications have appeared, from image processing to analyzing neurons in the human visual system.

Minimal uncertainty property 
The motivation for Gabor wavelets comes from finding some function  which minimizes its standard deviation in the time and frequency domains. More  formally, the variance in the position domain is:

The variance in the wave number domain is:

With these defined, the uncertainty is written as:

A function  that has the lowest theoretically possible uncertainty bound is the Gabor Wavelet.

Equation 
The equation of a 1-D Gabor wavelet is a Gaussian modulated by a complex exponential, described as follows:

It is also worth noting the Fourier transform of a Gabor wavelet, which is also a Gabor wavelet:

An example wavelet is given here:

Time-causal analogue of the Gabor wavelet 

When processing temporal signals, data from the future cannot be accessed, which leads to problems if attempting to use Gabor functions for processing real-time signals that depend upon the temporal dimension. A time-causal analogue of the Gabor filter has been developed in  based on replacing the Gaussian kernel in the Gabor function with a time-causal and time-recursive smoothing kernel referred to as the time-causal limit kernel. In this way, time-frequency analysis based on the resulting complex-valued extension of the time-causal limit kernel makes it possible to capture essentially similar transformations of a temporal signal as the Gabor wavelets can handle, and corresponding to the Heisenberg group, while carried out with strictly time-causal and time-recursive operations, see  for further details.

See also 
 Gabor transform
 Gabor filter
 Morlet wavelet

References

External links 
MATLAB code for 2D Gabor wavelets and Gabor feature extraction

Wavelets